Stealth is the ninth album by Scorn, released on November 19, 2007 through Ohm Resistance. After a five-year absence, November 2007 saw the band return to the studio properly with this album.

Track listing

Personnel 
Mick Harris – instruments
Nicolas Chevreux – photography, design

References

External links 
 

2007 albums
Scorn (band) albums